Parliamentary elections were held in Moldova on 25 February 2001. The result was a victory for the Party of Communists of the Republic of Moldova (PCRM), which won 71 of the 101 seats.

Electoral system
Parliament was elected by proportional representation in a single national constituency. In 2000 the electoral law was amended to change the electoral threshold, which had previously been at 4% for both political parties and independents. For independent candidates the threshold was lowered to 3%, whilst for political parties and electoral blocs it was raised to 6%.

Results

References

2001 elections in Moldova
Moldova
Parliamentary election
Parliamentary elections in Moldova
February 2001 events in Europe